Acrobasis aicha is a species of snout moth in the genus Acrobasis. It was described by Jan Asselbergs in 1998 and is found in Morocco.

References

Moths described in 1998
Acrobasis
Endemic fauna of Morocco
Moths of Africa